This is a list of islands in the Baltic Sea. The Baltic Sea proper is bordered to the north by the Bothnian Sea and, further north,  the Gulf of Bothnia, neither being part of the Baltic Sea proper. The eastern basins the Gulf of Finland and the Gulf of Riga are likewise not considered part of the Baltic Sea proper. Whether islands situated in, or on the borders to, these basins (Åland, Hailuoto and Kotlin) shall be included in the list is therefore a matter of definition.

The Danish islands Zealand (7,000 km² 2,200,000 people), Funen (2,984 km² 400,000 people), Als (312 km² 51,300 people), and Langeland (284 km² 13,300 people) lie in the Danish straits connecting the Baltic Sea and the Kattegat.

Listed by size

By population

See also 

List of islands of Denmark
List of islands of Estonia
List of islands of Finland
List of islands of Germany
List of islands of Poland
List of islands of Sweden
List of islands

Baltic
 
Islands
Islands
Islands
Islands
Islands
Islands
Islands